Topa may refer to:

Topa, a town in Jharkhand, India
Topa (river), a river in Bihor County, Romania
Țopa, a village in the commune Albești, Mureș County, Romania
Topa de Jos, a village in the commune Dobrești, Bihor County, Romania
Topa de Sus, a village in the commune Dobrești, Bihor County, Romania
Justin Topa, American baseball player
Tuoba, a clan in ancient China